Mohamed Sohel Al-Masum (5 August 1975 – 13 October 2015) was a Bangladeshi footballer who mainly played as a left back. He played for a total of four clubs during his short 10-year career.

International career
Born in Manikganj, Masum spent his youth career with Bangladesh Krira Shikkha Protishtan (BKSP). He played for the BKSP U-14 team, which won the Dana Cup in Denmark in 1990 and also the Gothia Cup in Sweden. Masum went to Bangkok in 1990 to play in the 1990 AFC U-16 Championship qualifiers, under coach Abdur Rahim . The Bangladesh team defeated Malaysia 4-0 and tied 1–1 with Thailand. The team also managed to earn a 2–2 draw against giants South Korea. Although the team did not qualify for the main competition, they finished second in a group full of higher ranked countries.

Masum made his senior international debut for the Bangladesh national team in 1995, during the 4-nation Tiger Trophy tournament held in Myanmar. Coach Otto Pfister named an inexperienced squad, with six new players making their debuts during the tournament, and Masum was one of the standouts. He managed to outplace veteran left-back  Masoud Rana, and played every single game during the country's first ever major tournament triumph. Masum also represented Bangladesh during the 1998 FIFA World Cup qualifiers.

Club career
He started his top-level career with Youngmen's Fakirerpool Club in the 1993 season alongside other famous footballers such as Hassan Al-Mamun and Amin Rana. Masum played as the left-back at Fakirerpool, which played some tremendous football over the next two seasons in a 5-3-2 formation, which was unique for a Bangladeshi club during that period. In his debut season, the Young Men's Club were promoted to the Dhaka Premier Football League. Masum was an integral part as the Young Men's finished third during their first season in the top-flight, leaving behind traditional powerhouses like Brothers Union and Muktijoddha Sangsad KC. The team also managed to defeat eventual champions Abahani Limited Dhaka.

During the 1998–99 season, Masum suffered a knee injury. Due to not receiving proper treatment the injury did not go away and eventually resulted in his retirement in 2000, at the age of only 25. He played from 95 to 99 in Abahani and then went on to play for Muktijoddha Sangsad KC and Mohammedan SC.

Personal life and death
On 13 October 2015, Masum died after suffering a Cardiac arrest. He was  buried at his family graveyard in Singair, Manikganj.

Honours
Fakirerpool Young Men's Club
Dhaka First Division League = 1993
Abahani Limited Dhaka
Dhaka Premier Division League = 1995
Federation Cup = 1997
Bangladesh
4-nation Tiger Trophy = 1995

References

Bangladeshi footballers
1975 births
2015 deaths
Bangladesh youth international footballers
Bangladesh international footballers
Muktijoddha Sangsad KC players
Abahani Limited (Dhaka) players
Mohammedan SC (Dhaka) players
Association football defenders
People from Manikganj District